The Museum of Drinking Water is a museum about drinking water in Zhongzheng District, Taipei, Taiwan. The museum is located at Taipei Water Park.

History
The museum building was originally built in 1908. It was declared a third-class historic site in 1993 and opened as museum for the first time in September the same year. In 1998, it shut down due to undergoing renovation. The museum was opened again on 30 April 2000 in an opening ceremony inaugurated by Taipei Mayor Ma Ying-jeou.

Exhibitions

The museum has the following areas:

 Water treatment facility
 Outdoor equipment display area
 Hillside sidewalk area
 Playground

Transportation
The museum is accessible within walking distance southwest from Gongguan Station of the Taipei Metro.

See also
 List of museums in Taiwan
 Water supply and sanitation in Taiwan

References

1993 establishments in Taiwan
Buildings and structures completed in 1908
Drink museums in Taiwan
Drinking water
Museums established in 1993
Drinking Water
Water organizations